was a Japanese actor.

Inoue started his acting career at the Haiyuza Theatre Company. Later, he signed his contract with Nikkatsu film company.

Filmography

Films
 Throne of Blood (1957) as Tsuzuki's messenger
 Sun in the Last Days of the Shogunate (1957) as Genta
 The Human Condition Road to Eternity (1959)
 Hana and Ryu (1962)
 Izo no Odoriko (1963)
 Aoi sanmyaku (1963) as Nakata
 Cruel Gun Story (1964) as Okada
 Our Blood Will Not Forgive (1964) as Ushigoro Tobita
 The Wild Sea (1969) as Takei
 Mushukunin Mikogami no Jkichiō Kawakazeni Kakowa Nagareta (1972)
 Sword of the Beast (1965) as Araiwa
 Tokyo Drifter 2: The Sea is Bright Red as the Color of Love (1966) as Onijima
 Zatoichi and the Fugitives (1968) as Kumeji
 Men and War (1970) 
 Tempyō no Iraka (1980) as Yoshihiko
 Minna no Ie (2001) as Painter

Television drama
Taiga drama
 Taikōki (1965) as Date Masamune
 Ten to Chi to (1969) as Tomita Gōzaemon
 Haru no Sakamichi (1971) as Kawai Takeemon
 Tokugawa ieyasu (1983) as Yamagata Masakage
 Oshizamurai Kiichihōgan (1973) (ep.9) as Sabu
 Lone Wolf and Cub (1973) (ep.15) as Jyunai Kutsuki
 Zatoichi (1974) (ep.12) as Gonzō
 The Fierce Battles of Edo (1979) (ep.5) 
 Tobe Hissatsu Uragoroshi (1979) (ep.16) as Izō
 Shadow Warriors (1980) (ep.9)
 Pro Hunter (1981) (ep.7)
 Taiyō ni Hoero! (1982) (ep.495) as Denkichi Hakamada, (1985) (ep.636) as Kōzō Nagata
 Seibu Keisatsu (1982–83) as Gentarō Hama
 Hissatsu Shigotonin V (1985) (ep.5) as Kiheiji
 Onihei Hankachō (1991) (ep.18) as Kosuke, (1995) (ep.9) as Kannana

References

External links
 

Japanese male film actors
20th-century Japanese male actors
1929 births
2013 deaths